Aroldo Bellini (8 February 1902 – 14 October 1984) was an Italian sculptor. His work was part of the sculpture event in the art competition at the 1936 Summer Olympics.

References

1902 births
1984 deaths
20th-century Italian sculptors
20th-century Italian male artists
Italian male sculptors
Olympic competitors in art competitions
People from Perugia